Michael Brabek (born 18 February 1979) is an Australian former professional rugby league footballer who played in the 1990s. He played for the Western Suburbs Magpies.

Playing career
Brabek was graded by the now defunct Western Suburbs Magpies in 1998. The Magpies finished the season with the wooden spoon and folded at the end of the season.

Brabek played for the Magpies' in their final ever first grade game which was a 60−16 loss to the Auckland Warriors at Campbelltown Stadium. Wests controversially merged with rivals the Balmain Tigers to form the Wests Tigers as part of the NRL's rationalization strategy. Brabek was not offered a contract to play with the newly formed team for the 2000 NRL season and subsequently never played first grade rugby league again. He played in the local Canberra competition for several seasons after leaving the NRL.

References

1979 births
Australian people of Lebanese descent
Sportspeople of Lebanese descent
Australian rugby league players
Western Suburbs Magpies players
Rugby league second-rows
Rugby league locks
Rugby league players from Sydney
Living people